The Bishop of Aston is an episcopal title used by a suffragan bishop of the Church of England Diocese of Birmingham, in the Province of Canterbury, England. The title takes its name after Aston, an area of the City of Birmingham; the See was erected under the Suffragans Nomination Act 1888, by Order in Council dated 15 July 1954. The suffragan bishop of Aston assists the diocesan bishop of Birmingham, sharing Episcopal oversight throughout the diocese.

Anne Hollinghurst became suffragan Bishop of Aston – the first woman to hold the post – upon her consecration on 29 September 2015. The bishop's residence is Bishop's Lodge, Sutton Coldfield.

List of bishops

References

External links
 Crockford's Clerical Directory - Listings

 
Anglican suffragan bishops in the Diocese of Birmingham
Anglican Diocese of Birmingham